The New Brighton Area School District is a suburban public school district located in Beaver County, Pennsylvania. It serves the boroughs of New Brighton, Pulaski, and Fallston, and the township of Daugherty. According to 2000 federal census data, the district serves a resident population of 12,065 people.

The district features three schools: New Brighton High School (9-12), New Brighton Middle School (6-8), and New Brighton Elementary School (K-5).

References

School districts in Beaver County, Pennsylvania